Wohldorf-Ohlstedt is a neighborhood of Hamburg, Germany, in the borough Wandsbek. It is the most northern quarter and one of the wealthiest in Hamburg.

Geography 
Wohldorf-Ohlstedt borders the quarters Duvenstedt, Lemsahl-Mellingstedt and Bergstedt. Outside Hamburg it borders the Kreise Tangstedt, Jersbek and Ammersbek in Schleswig-Holstein.

Politics
These are the results of Wohldorf-Ohlstedt in the Hamburg state election:

Wohldorf-Ohlstedt belongs to the electoral district of Alstertal-Walddörfer.

Transport
Wohlstedt-Ohlstedt has access to one U-Bahn station.

References

Quarters of Hamburg
Wandsbek